Jiashu Township is an rural township in Liling City, Zhuzhou City, Hunan Province, People's Republic of China.

Cityscape
The township is divided into 12 villages, the following areas: Shanxian Village, Fenglin Village, Jiashu Village, Jinglin Village, Wushi Village, Yucha Village, Heshu Village, Lidu Village, Luoru Village, Shenquan Village, Jingchong Village, and Xindatang Village.

References

External links

Divisions of Liling